Songül Dikmen Gürsoytrak (born May 8, 1981 in Ankara) is a Turkish volleyball player. She also played for İller Bankası, Emlak Toki, Gaziantep Şahinbey Bld. and Konya Ereğli. Songül won Turkish League, Cup and Super Cup championship with Fenerbahçe Acıbadem in 2009-10 season.

Songül Dikmen won the bronze medal at the 2010–11 CEV Champions League with Fenerbahçe Acıbadem.

Awards

Clubs
 2009-10 Aroma Women's Volleyball League -  Champion, with Fenerbahçe Acıbadem
 2009-10 Turkish Cup -  Runner-Up, with Fenerbahçe Acıbadem
 2010 Turkish Super Cup -  Champion, with Fenerbahçe Acıbadem
 2009-10 CEV Champions League -  Runner-Up, with Fenerbahçe Acıbadem
 2010 FIVB World Club Championship -  Champion, with Fenerbahçe Acıbadem
 2010-11 CEV Champions League -  Bronze medal, with Fenerbahçe Acıbadem
 2010-11 Aroma Women's Volleyball League -  Champion, with Fenerbahçe Acıbadem

See also
 Turkish women in sports

External links
 Player profile at fenerbahce.org

References

1981 births
Living people
Sportspeople from Ankara
Turkish women's volleyball players
Fenerbahçe volleyballers
İller Bankası volleyballers